The Dominion of New England in America (1686–1689) was an administrative union of English colonies covering all of New England and the Mid-Atlantic Colonies with the exception of the Delaware Colony and the Province of Pennsylvania. The region's political structure was one of centralized control similar to the model used by the Spanish monarchy under the Viceroyalty of New Spain. The dominion was unacceptable to most colonists because they deeply resented being stripped of their rights and having their colonial charters revoked. Governor Sir Edmund Andros tried to make legal and structural changes, but most of these were undone and the Dominion was overthrown as soon as word was received that King James II had left the throne in England. One notable change was the introduction of the Church of England into Massachusetts, whose Puritan leaders had previously refused to allow it any sort of foothold.

The Dominion encompassed a very large area from the Delaware River in the south to Penobscot Bay in the north, composed of the Province of New Hampshire, Massachusetts Bay Colony, Plymouth Colony, Colony of Rhode Island and Providence Plantations, Connecticut Colony, Province of New York, the provinces of East Jersey and West Jersey, and a small portion of Maine. It was too large for a single governor to manage. Governor Andros was highly unpopular and was seen as a threat by most political factions. News of the Glorious Revolution in England reached Boston in 1689, and the Puritans launched the 1689 Boston revolt against Andros, arresting him and his officers.

Leisler's Rebellion in New York deposed the dominion's lieutenant governor Francis Nicholson. After these events, the colonies that had been assembled into the dominion reverted to their previous forms of government, although some governed formally without a charter. King William III of England and Queen Mary II eventually issued new charters.

Background
A number of English colonies were established in North America and in the West Indies during the first half of the 17th century, with varying attributes. Some originated as commercial ventures, such as the Virginia Colony, while others were founded for religious reasons, such as Plymouth Colony and Massachusetts Bay Colony. The governments of the colonies also varied. Virginia became a crown colony, despite its corporate beginning, while Massachusetts and other New England colonies had corporate charters and a great deal of administrative freedom. Other areas were proprietary colonies, such as Maryland and Carolina, owned and operated by one or a few individuals.

Following the English Restoration in 1660, King Charles II sought to streamline the administration of these colonial territories. Charles and his government began a process that brought a number of the colonies under direct crown control. One reason for these actions was the cost of administration of individual colonies, but another significant reason was the regulation of trade. Throughout the 1660s, the English Parliament passed a number of laws to regulate the trade of the colonies, collectively called the Navigation Acts. The American colonists resisted these laws, particularly in the New England colonies which had established significant trading networks with other English colonies and with other European countries and their colonies, especially Spain and the Dutch Republic. The Navigation Acts also outlawed some existing New England practices, in effect turning merchants into smugglers while significantly increasing the cost of doing business.

Some of the New England colonies presented specific problems for the king, and combining those colonies into a single administrative entity was seen as a way to resolve those problems. Plymouth Colony had never been formally chartered, and the New Haven Colony had sheltered two of the regicides of Charles I, the king's father. The territory of Maine was disputed by competing grantees and by Massachusetts, and New Hampshire was a very small, recently established crown colony. And between 1652 and 1682, the Massachusetts General Court authorized Boston silversmith John Hull to illegally produce local coinage, which the government considered treasonous.

Massachusetts had a long history of virtually theocratic rule, in addition to their widespread resistance to the Navigation Acts, and they exhibited little tolerance for non-Puritans, including supporters of the Church of England (which was most important for the king). Charles II repeatedly sought to change the Massachusetts government, but they resisted all substantive attempts at reform. In 1683, legal proceedings began to vacate the Massachusetts charter; it was formally annulled in June 1684.

England's desire for colonies that produced agricultural staples worked well for the southern colonies, which produced tobacco, rice, and indigo, but not so well for New England due to the geology of the region. Lacking a suitable staple, the New Englanders engaged in trade and became successful competitors to English merchants. They were now starting to develop workshops that threatened to deprive England of its lucrative colonial market for manufactured articles, such as textiles, leather goods, and ironware. The plan, therefore, was to establish a uniform all-powerful government over the northern colonies so that the people would be diverted away from manufacturing and foreign trade.

Establishment
Following the revocation of the Massachusetts charter, Charles II and the Lords of Trade moved forward with plans to establish a unified administration over at least some of the New England colonies. The specific objectives of the dominion included the regulation of trade, reformation of land title practices to conform more to English methods and practices, coordination on matters of defense, and a streamlining of the administration into fewer centers. The Dominion initially comprised the territories of the Massachusetts Bay Colony, the Plymouth Colony, the Province of New Hampshire, the Province of Maine, and the Narraganset Country (present-day Washington County, Rhode Island).

Charles II had chosen Colonel Percy Kirke to govern the dominion, but Charles died before the commission was approved. King James II approved Kirke's commission in 1685, but Kirke came under harsh criticism for his role in putting down Monmouth's Rebellion, and his commission was withdrawn. A provisional commission was issued on October 8, 1685 to Massachusetts Bay native Joseph Dudley as President of the Council of New England, due to delays in developing the commission for Kirke's intended successor Sir Edmund Andros.

Dudley's limited commission specified that he would rule with an appointed council and no representative legislature. The councillors named as members of this body included a cross-section of politically moderate men from the old colonial governments. Edward Randolph had served as the crown agent investigating affairs in New England, and he was appointed to the council, as well. Randolph was also commissioned with a long list of other posts, including secretary of the dominion, collector of customs, and deputy postmaster.

Dudley administration
Dudley's charter arrived in Boston on May 14, 1686, and he formally took charge of Massachusetts on May 25. His rule did not begin auspiciously, since a number of Massachusetts magistrates who had been named to his council refused to serve. According to Edward Randolph, the Puritan magistrates "were of opinion that God would never suffer me to land again in this country, and thereupon began in a most arbitrary manner to assert their power higher than at any time before." Elections of colonial military officers were also compromised when many of them refused to serve. Dudley made a number of judicial appointments, generally favoring the political moderates who had supported accommodation of the king's wishes in the battle over the old charter.

Dudley was significantly hampered by the inability to raise revenues in the dominion. His commission did not allow the introduction of new revenue laws, and the Massachusetts government had repealed all such laws in 1683, anticipating the loss of the charter. Furthermore, many refused to pay the few remaining taxes on the grounds that they had been enacted by the old government and were thus invalid. Attempts by Dudley and Randolph were largely unsuccessful at introducing the Church of England due to a lack of funding, but were also hampered by the perceived political danger of imposing on the existing churches for their use.

Dudley and Randolph enforced the Navigation Acts, although they did not adhere entirely to the laws. Some variations were overlooked, understanding that certain provisions of the acts were unfair (some resulted in the payments of multiple duties), and they suggested to the Lords of Trade that the laws be modified to ameliorate these conditions. However, the Massachusetts economy suffered, also negatively affected by external circumstances. A dispute eventually occurred between Dudley and Randolph over matters related to trade.

During Dudley's administration, the Lords of Trade decided on September 9, 1686 to include into the dominion the colonies of Rhode Island and Connecticut, based on a petition from Dudley's council. Andros's commission had been issued in June, and he was given an annex to his commission to incorporate them into the dominion.

Andros administration
Andros had previously been governor of New York; he arrived in Boston on December 20, 1686 and immediately assumed power. He took a hard-line position, claiming that the colonists had left behind all their rights as Englishmen when they left England. The Reverend John Wise rallied his parishioners in 1687 to protest and resist taxes; Andros had him arrested, convicted, and fined. An Andros official explained, "Mr. Wise, you have no more privileges Left you then not to be Sold for Slaves."

His commission called for governance by himself, again with a council. The initial composition of the council included representatives from each of the colonies which the dominion absorbed, but the council's quorums were dominated by representatives from Massachusetts and Plymouth because of the inconvenience of travel and the fact that travel costs were not reimbursed.

Church of England
Shortly after his arrival, Andros asked each of the Puritan churches in Boston if its meetinghouse could be used for services of the Church of England, but he was consistently rebuffed. He then demanded keys to Samuel Willard's Third Church in 1687, and services were held there under the auspices of Robert Ratcliff until 1688, when King's Chapel was built.

Revenue laws
After Andros' arrival, the council began a long process of harmonizing laws throughout the dominion to conform more closely to English laws. This work was so time-consuming that Andros issued a proclamation in March 1687 stating that pre-existing laws would remain in effect until they were revised. Massachusetts had no pre-existing tax laws, so a scheme of taxation was developed that would apply to the entire dominion, developed by a committee of landowners. The first proposal derived its revenues from import duties, principally alcohol. After much debate, a different proposal was abruptly put forward and adopted, in essence reviving previous Massachusetts tax laws. These laws had been unpopular with farmers who felt that the taxes were too high on livestock. In order to bring in immediate revenue, Andros also received approval to increase the import duties on alcohol.

The first attempts to enforce the revenue laws were met by stiff resistance from a number of Massachusetts communities. Several towns refused to choose commissioners to assess the town population and estates, and officials from a number of them were consequently arrested and brought to Boston. Some were fined and released, while others were imprisoned until they promised to perform their duties. The leaders of Ipswich had been most vocal in their opposition to the law; they were tried and convicted of misdemeanor offenses.

The other provinces did not resist the imposition of the new law, even though the rates were higher than they had been under the previous colonial administration, at least in Rhode Island. Plymouth's relatively poor landowners were hard hit because of the high rates on livestock.

Town meeting laws
One consequence of the tax protest was that Andros sought to restrict town meetings, since these were where that protest had begun. He, therefore, introduced a law that limited meetings to a single annual meeting, solely for the purpose of electing officials, and explicitly banning meetings at other times for any reason. This loss of local power was widely hated. Many protests were made that the town meeting and tax laws were violations of the Magna Carta, which guaranteed taxation by representatives of the people.

Land titles and taxes
Andros dealt a major blow to the colonists by challenging their title to the land; unlike England, the great majority of Americans were land-owners. Taylor says that, because they "regarded secure real estate as fundamental to their liberty, status, and prosperity, the colonists felt horrified by the sweeping and expensive challenge to their land titles." Andros had been instructed to bring colonial land title practices more in line with those in England, and to introduce quit-rents as a means of raising colonial revenues. Titles issued in Massachusetts, New Hampshire, and Maine under the colonial administration often suffered from defects of form (for example, lacking an imprint of the colonial seal), and most of them did not include a quit-rent payment. Land grants in colonial Connecticut and Rhode Island had been made before either colony had a charter, and there were conflicting claims in a number of areas.

The manner in which Andros approached the issue was doubly divisive, since it threatened any landowner whose title was in any way dubious. Some landowners went through the confirmation process, but many refused, since they did not want to face the possibility of losing their land, and they viewed the process as a thinly veiled land grab. The Puritans of Plymouth and Massachusetts Bay were among the latter, some of whom had extensive landholdings. All of the existing land titles in Massachusetts had been granted under the now-vacated colonial charter; in essence, Andros declared them to be void, and required landowners to recertify their ownership, paying fees to the dominion and becoming subject to the charge of a quit-rent.

Andros attempted to compel the certification of ownership by issuing writs of intrusion, but large landowners who owned many parcels contested these individually, rather than recertifying all of their lands. Few new titles issued were issued during the Andros regime; of 200 applications made, only about 20 were approved.

Connecticut charter
Andros' commission included Connecticut, and he asked Connecticut Governor Robert Treat to surrender the colonial charter not long after his arrival in Boston. Connecticut officials formally acknowledged Andros' authority, unlike Rhode Island, whose officials acceded to the dominion but in fact did little to assist him. Connecticut continued to run their government according to the charter, holding quarterly meetings of the legislature and electing colony-wide officials, while Treat and Andros negotiated over the surrender of the charter. In October 1687, Andros finally decided to travel to Connecticut to personally see to the matter. He arrived in Hartford on October 31, accompanied by an honor guard, and met that evening with the colonial leadership. According to legend, the charter was laid out on the table for all to see during this meeting. The lights in the room unexpectedly went out and, when they were relit, the charter had disappeared. It was said to have been hidden in a nearby oak tree (referred to afterward as the Charter Oak) so that a search of nearby buildings could not locate the document.

Whatever the truth of the legend, Connecticut records show that its government formally surrendered its seals and ceased operation that day. Andros then traveled throughout the colony, making judicial and other appointments, before returning to Boston. On December 29, 1687, the dominion council formally extended its laws over Connecticut, completing the assimilation of the New England colonies.

Inclusion of New York and the Jerseys
On May 7, 1688, the provinces of New York, East Jersey, and West Jersey were added to the Dominion. They were remote from Boston where Andros had his seat, so New York and the Jerseys were run by Lieutenant Governor Francis Nicholson from New York City. Nicholson was an army captain and protégé of colonial secretary William Blathwayt who came to Boston in early 1687 as part of Andros' honor guard and had been promoted to his council. During the summer of 1688, Andros traveled first to New York and then to the Jerseys to establish his commission. Dominion governance of the Jerseys was complicated by the fact that the proprietors' charters had been revoked, yet they had retained their property and petitioned Andros for what were traditional manorial rights. The dominion period in the Jerseys was relatively uneventful because of their distance from the power centers and the unexpected end of the Dominion in 1689.

Indian diplomacy
In 1687, governor of New France Jacques-René de Brisay de Denonville, Marquis de Denonville launched an attack against Seneca villages in what is now western New York. His objective was to disrupt trade between the English at Albany and the Iroquois confederation, to which the Seneca belonged, and to break the Covenant Chain, a peace that Andros had negotiated in 1677 while he was governor of New York. New York Governor Thomas Dongan appealed for help, and King James ordered Andros to render assistance. James also entered into negotiations with Louis XIV of France, which resulted in an easing of tensions on the northwestern frontier.

On New England's northeastern frontier, however, the Abenaki harbored grievances against English settlers, and they began an offensive in early 1688. Andros made an expedition into Maine early in the year, in which he raided a number of Indian settlements. He also raided the trading outpost and home of Jean-Vincent d'Abbadie de Saint-Castin on Penobscot Bay. His careful preservation of the Catholic Castin's chapel was a source of later accusations of "popery" against Andros.

Andros took over the administration of New York in August 1688, and he met with the Iroquois at Albany to renew the covenant. In this meeting, he annoyed the Iroquois by referring to them as "children" (that is, subservient to the English) rather than "brethren" (that is, equals). He returned to Boston amid further attacks on the New England frontier by Abenaki parties, who admitted that they were doing so in part because of French encouragement. The situation in Maine had also deteriorated again, with English colonists raiding Indian villages and shipping the captives to Boston. Andros castigated the Mainers for this unwarranted act and ordered the Indians released and returned to Maine, earning the hatred of the Maine settlers. He then returned to Maine with a significant force, and began the construction of additional fortifications to protect the settlers. Andros spent the winter in Maine, and returned to Boston in March upon hearing rumors of revolution in England and discontent in Boston.

Glorious Revolution and dissolution

The religious leaders of Massachusetts, led by Cotton and Increase Mather, were opposed to the rule of Andros, and organized dissent targeted to influence the court in London. After King James published the Declaration of Indulgence in May 1687, Increase Mather sent a letter to the king thanking him for the declaration, and then he suggested to his peers that they also express gratitude to the king as a means to gain favor and influence. Ten pastors agreed to do so, and they decided to send Mather to England to press their case against Andros. Edward Randolph attempted to stop him; Mather was arrested, tried, and exonerated on one charge, but Randolph made a second arrest warrant with new charges. Mather was clandestinely spirited aboard a ship bound for England in April 1688. He and other Massachusetts agents were well received by James, who promised in October 1688 that the colony's concerns would be addressed. However, the events of the Glorious Revolution took over, and by December James had been deposed by William III and Mary II.

The Massachusetts agents then petitioned the new monarchs and the Lords of Trade for restoration of the old Massachusetts charter. Mather furthermore convinced the Lords of Trade to delay notifying Andros of the revolution. He had already dispatched a letter to previous colonial governor Simon Bradstreet containing news that a report (prepared before the revolution) stated that the charter had been illegally annulled, and that the magistrates should "prepare the minds of the people for a change." News of the revolution apparently reached some individuals as early as late March, and Bradstreet is one of several possible organizers of the mob that formed in Boston on April 18, 1689. He and other pre-Dominion magistrates and some members of Andros' council addressed an open letter to Andros on that day calling for his surrender in order to quiet the mob. Andros, Randolph, Dudley, and other dominion supporters were arrested and imprisoned in Boston.

In effect, the dominion then collapsed, as local authorities in each colony seized dominion representatives and reasserted their earlier power. In Plymouth, dominion councilor Nathaniel Clark was arrested on April 22, and previous governor Thomas Hinckley was reinstated. Rhode Island authorities organized a resumption of its charter with elections on May 1, but previous governor Walter Clarke refused to serve, and the colony continued without one. In Connecticut, the earlier government was also rapidly readopted. New Hampshire was temporarily left without formal government, and came under de facto rule by Massachusetts Governor Simon Bradstreet.

News of the Boston revolt reached New York by April 26, but Lieutenant Governor Nicholson did not take any immediate action. Andros managed during his captivity to have a message sent to Nicholson. Nicholson received the request for assistance in mid-May, but he was unable to take any effective action due to rising tensions in New York, combined with the fact that most of Nicholson's troops had been sent to Maine.  At the end of May, Nicholson was overthrown by local colonists supported by the militia in Leisler's Rebellion, and he fled to England.  Leisler governed New York until 1691, when King William commissioned Colonel Henry Sloughter as its governor.  Sloughter had Leisler tried on charges of high treason; he was convicted in a trial presided over by Joseph Dudley and then executed.

Massachusetts and Plymouth
The dissolution of the dominion presented legal problems for both Massachusetts and Plymouth. Plymouth never had a royal charter, and the charter of Massachusetts had been revoked. As a result, the restored governments lacked legal foundations for their existence, an issue that the political opponents of the leadership made it a point to raise. This was particularly problematic in Massachusetts, whose long frontier with New France saw its defenders recalled in the aftermath of the revolt, and was exposed to French and Indian raids after the outbreak of King William's War in 1689. The cost of colonial defense resulted in a heavy tax burden, and the war also made it difficult to rebuild the colony's trade.

Agents for both colonies worked in England to rectify the charter issues, with Increase Mather petitioning the Lords of Trade for a restoration of the old Massachusetts charter. King William was informed that this would result in a return of the Puritan government, and he wanted to prevent that from happening, so the Lords of Trade decided to solve the issue by combining the two colonies. The resulting Province of Massachusetts Bay combined the territories of Massachusetts and Plymouth along with Martha's Vineyard, Nantucket, and the Elizabeth Islands that had been part of Dukes County in the Province of New York.

Administrators
This is a list of the chief administrators of the Dominion of New England in America from 1684 to 1689:

Attorney General 
The Attorney General was an appointed executive officer of the Dominion of New England:

See also
 History of New England
 New England Colonies
 New England Confederation

References

Further reading

 Dunn, Richard S. "The Glorious Revolution and America" in The Origins of Empire: British Overseas Enterprise to the Close of the Seventeenth Century ( The Oxford History of the British Empire, (1998) vol 1 pp 445–66.

Taylor, Alan, American Colonies: the Settling of North America, Penguin Books, 2001.

 Webb, Stephen Saunders. Lord Churchill's coup: the Anglo-American empire and the Glorious Revolution reconsidered (Syracuse University Press, 1998)

 
States and territories established in 1686
States and territories disestablished in 1689
English colonization of the Americas
History of the Thirteen Colonies
1686 establishments in the Thirteen Colonies
Colonial United States (British)
History of New England
Pre-statehood history of New York (state)
Pre-statehood history of New Jersey
Former colonies in North America